Courageous class may refer to:

 , ship class of the Royal Navy, the United Kingdom
 , ship class of the Royal Navy, the United Kingdom